Songs of the Vilna Ghetto is a compilation LP record featuring twelve Yiddish songs from World War II era. The songs were composed by the inmates of the Vilna Ghetto during the Holocaust and are sung by Nechama Hendel, Chava Alberstein, and Shimon Israeli with accompaniment from the CBS Israel Orchestra and Choir, conducted by Gil Aldema. The album contains an 8-page booklet with lyrics in the Yiddish language, photographs from the ghetto, and historical information about the songs in English.  According to the liner notes, the recording "was prepared by the Yitzhak Kalznelson House of the Ghetto Fighters, at Kibbutz Lochamei Hagetaot, Israel, in co-operation with the Vilna Organisation [sic] of Haifa."

Track listing

References

Jewish music albums
Vilna Ghetto
1969 albums
Yiddish culture in Lithuania